Stenoptilodes sematodactyla is a moth of the family Pterophoridae that is known from Argentina. Adults are on wing in December. The larvae feed on a Mentha species.

External links

sematodactyla
Moths described in 1885
Endemic fauna of Argentina
Moths of South America